Tropicus pusillus is a species of variegated mud-loving beetle in the family Heteroceridae. It is found in the Caribbean Sea, Central America, and North America.

References

Further reading

 

Byrrhoidea
Articles created by Qbugbot
Beetles described in 1823